Robert Dabney Asher (born June 13, 1948) is a former professional American football offensive tackle in the National Football League for the Dallas Cowboys and Chicago Bears. He played college football at Vanderbilt University.

Early years
Asher attended Bishop Denis J. O'Connell High School where he practiced basketball until his junior year, when he began playing football. He also practiced track and tennis.

He accepted a football scholarship from Vanderbilt University, where he started in every game during his three years of eligibility. As a junior, he was named All-South and second-team All-SEC.

As a senior, he received first-team All-SEC and second-team All-American honors. He also played in the Chicago College All-Star Game, the North–South Shrine Game, the Senior Bowl and the Canadian American Bowl.

Professional career

Dallas Cowboys
During the 1970 NFL Draft, the Dallas Cowboys traded cornerback Phil Clark and running back Craig Baynham to the Chicago Bears, in exchange for a second round draft choice (27th overall), that the team used to select Asher.

He injured his knee as a rookie and played in only 6 games. Doctors thought he could avoid surgery, but had to eventually perform the procedure in 1971, which would cost him a chance to start and play in Super Bowl VI. The team placed him on the injured reserve list and replaced him by signing future hall of famer Forrest Gregg.

On August 17, 1972, he was traded to the Chicago Bears along with defensive tackle Bill Line and a second round draft choice (#48-Gary Hrivnak), in exchange for quarterback Jack Concannon.

Chicago Bears
In 1972, he became the starter at right tackle. In 1975, he was passed over on the depth chart by Jeff Sevy. He retired in 1976, after suffering from knee and calf injuries.

References

External links
 Vandy Ace Bob Asher 'A' Student In Aggression

1948 births
Living people
Sportspeople from Arlington County, Virginia
Players of American football from Virginia
American football offensive linemen
Vanderbilt Commodores football players
Dallas Cowboys players
Chicago Bears players